VIRsiRNAdb is a database of siRNA/shRNA targeting viral genome regions.

See also
 siRNA
 shRNA

References

External links
 http://crdd.osdd.net/servers/virsirnadb.

Biological databases
RNA interference
RNA